Kapoe is a district (amphoe) of Ranong province, southern Thailand.

Geography
Neighboring districts are (from the north clockwise) Mueang Ranong of Ranong Province, Phato of Chumphon province, Chaiya, Tha Chang and Ban Ta Khun of Surat Thani province, and Suk Samran of Ranong. To the west is the Andaman Sea.

The southeastern part of the district is part of the Khlong Nakha Wildlife Sanctuary. The mangrove forests in the estuary of the Kapoe River are part of the Ranong Biosphere Reserve.

Administration
The district is divided into five sub-districts (tambons), which are further subdivided into 34 villages (muban). Kapoe itself is a township (thesaban tambon) and covers parts of the tambon Kapoe. There are four tambon administrative organizations (TAO) responsible for the non-municipal areas.

References

Districts of Ranong province